Asplenium viride is a species of fern known as the green spleenwort because of its green stipes and rachides. This feature easily distinguishes it from the very similar-looking maidenhair spleenwort, Asplenium trichomanes.

Taxonomy
Green spleenwort was described by Carl Linnaeus in his 1753 Species Plantarum, under the name "Asplenium Trich. ramosum", with a type locality of "" (rocks in Caernarfonshire). Under the rules of the International Code of Botanical Nomenclature, phrase names such as "Asplenium Trichomanes ramosum" are to be treated as orthographic errors – in this case, for "Asplenium ramosum". That name was later rejected in favour of William Hudson's later name Asplenium viride, which had a type locality of "" (damp rocks in the mountains of Wales, Yorkshire and Westmorland).

A global phylogeny of Asplenium published in 2020 divided the genus into eleven clades, which were given informal names pending further taxonomic study. A. viride belongs to the "A. viride subclade" of the "A. trichomanes clade". The A. trichomanes clade has a worldwide distribution. Members of the clade grow on rocks and usually have once-pinnate leaf blades with slender, chestnut- to dark-brown stalks. The A. viride subclade, which contains only A. viride and its allopolyploid descendant A. adulterinum, is exceptional in having green stalks.

Ecology
A. viride is a native species of northern and western North America and northern Europe and Asia. It is a small rock fern, growing on calcareous rock. It is a diploid species, with n = 36, and hybridizes with Asplenium trichomanes to produce Asplenium × adulterinum, found on Vancouver Island, British Columbia.

References

External links

Flora of North America: Asplenium viride
Asplenium viride Green Spleenwort, Wild Flowers of the British Isles
Asplenium viride, Skye Flora
Asplenium viride, Flora of Northern Ireland

viride
Ferns of the United States
Flora of Canada
Flora of the Eastern United States
Plants described in 1762
Taxa named by William Hudson (botanist)